János Zsombor Pelikán (born 19 April 1995) is a Hungarian cyclist, who currently rides for UCI ProTeam .

Major results

2012
 1st  Time trial, National Junior Road Championships
 1st Stage 6 Tour of Pécs
2013
 National Junior Road Championships
1st  Road race
1st  Time trial
2014
 1st  Time trial, National Under–23 Road Championships
2016
 National Road Championships
1st  Road race
1st  Time trial
 1st  Road race, National Under–23 Road Championships
2017
 National Road Championships
1st  Time trial
4th Road race
 1st Grand Prix Südkärnten
 6th Overall Gemenc Grand Prix
2018
 3rd Time trial, National Road Championships
 7th Overall Okolo Jižních Čech
2019
 1st V4 Special Series Debrecen–Ibrany
 1st Stage 2 Tour de Serbie
 2nd Time trial, National Road Championships
 2nd V4 Special Series Vasarosnameny–Nyiregyhaza
2021 
 1st  Hungarian rider classification, Tour de Hongrie
 1st Prologue Tour of Romania

References

External links

1995 births
Living people
Hungarian male cyclists
Cyclists from Budapest
European Games competitors for Hungary
Cyclists at the 2019 European Games